Pikasilla may refer to several places in Estonia:

Pikasilla, Valga County, village in Põdrala Parish, Valga County
Pikasilla, Võru County, village in Lasva Parish, Võru County